Palmer Fire School, also known as Firemen's Hall, is a historic school complex for firefighters located at Charlotte, Mecklenburg County, North Carolina. The complex consists of the 1940, one-story, rock-faced assembly hall and the 1938, six-story, red-brick training tower. The assembly hall is a Late Gothic Revival style building, five bays wide with a stuccoed, crenellated parapet and projecting end bays.  Its construction was funded by the Works Progress Administration (WPA) and was the only drill school for firemen funded by the WPA.

It was added to the National Register of Historic Places in 2004.

See also 
 Fire Station No. 2 (Charlotte, North Carolina)
 Grinnell Company-General Fire Extinguisher Company Complex

References

Works Progress Administration in North Carolina
School buildings on the National Register of Historic Places in North Carolina
Gothic Revival architecture in North Carolina
School buildings completed in 1940
Buildings and structures in Charlotte, North Carolina
National Register of Historic Places in Mecklenburg County, North Carolina
Firefighting academies